Kekri may refer to:

 Kekri (festival), a Finnish festival
 Kekri, Rajasthan, a city in the state of Rajasthan, India
 Kekri (Rajasthan Assembly constituency), the state assembly constituency centered around the city

See also 
 Kekrinal